Fred Hodgson may refer to:

 J. F. Hodgson (1867–1947), English socialist activist
 Fred W. Hodgson (1886–1930), American architect

See also
 Frederick Hodgson (disambiguation)